Charles XV also Carl (Carl Ludvig Eugen); Swedish: Karl XV and Norwegian: Karl IV (3 May 1826 – 18 September 1872) was King of Sweden (Charles XV) and Norway, there often referred to as Charles IV, from 8 July 1859 until his death in 1872. Though known as King Charles XV in Sweden (and also on contemporary Norwegian coins), he was actually the ninth Swedish king by that name, as his predecessor Charles IX (reigned 1604–1611) had adopted a numeral according to a fictitious history of Sweden. Charles XV was the third Swedish monarch from the House of Bernadotte. He was the first one to be born in Sweden, and the first to be raised from birth in the Lutheran faith.

Biography

Early life
He was born in Stockholm Palace, Stockholm, in 1826 and dubbed Duke of Scania at birth. Born the eldest son of Crown Prince Oscar of Sweden and his wife Crown Princess Josephine, he would be second in line to the throne of his grandfather, the ruling King Charles XIV John of Sweden.  During his childhood he was placed in the care of the royal governess countess Christina Ulrika Taube. When he was just 15, he was given his first officer's commission in 1841 by his grandfather the king.

Crown Prince

The aging King Charles XIV John would suffer a stroke on his 81st birthday in 1844, dying little more than a month later. His successor would be his son, Charles's father Oscar, who ascended the throne as King Oscar I of Sweden. Upon his father's accession to the throne in 1844, the youth Charles was made a chancellor of the universities of Uppsala and Lund, and in 1853 chancellor of Royal Swedish Academy of Arts. On 11 February 1846 he was made an honorary member of the Royal Swedish Academy of Sciences.

The Crown Prince was Viceroy of Norway briefly in 1856 and 1857. He became Regent on 25 September 1857, and king on the death of his father on 8 July 1859. As grandson of Augusta of Bavaria, he was a descendant of Gustav I of Sweden and Charles IX of Sweden, whose Vasa blood returned to the throne after being lost in 1818 when Charles XIII of Sweden died.

On 19 June 1850 he married in Stockholm Louise of the Netherlands, niece of William II of the Netherlands through her father and niece of William I of Prussia, German Emperor, through her mother.    The couple were personally quite dissimilar; Louise was a cultured and refined woman, however, she was considered to be quite plain and Charles was disappointed with her appearance.    Louise was in love with her husband, whereas he preferred other women, saddening her deeply. His well-known mistresses included the actress Laura Bergnéhr, the countess Josephine Sparre, Wilhelmine Schröder and the actresses Hanna Styrell and Elise Hwasser, and the Crown Prince neglected his shy wife. On the other hand, his relationship to his only daughter, Louise, was warm and close.

Reign

As Crown Prince, Charles's brusque manner led many to regard his future accession with some apprehension, yet he proved to be one of the most popular of Scandinavian kings and a constitutional ruler in the best sense of the word. His reign was remarkable for its manifold and far-reaching reforms. Sweden's existing municipal law (1862), ecclesiastical law (1863) and criminal law (1864) were enacted appropriately enough under the direction of a king whose motto was: Land skall med lag byggas – "With law shall the land be built". Charles also helped Louis De Geer to carry through his reform of the Parliament of Sweden in 1866. He also declared the freedom of women by passing the law of legal majority for unmarried women in 1858 – his sister Princess Eugenie became the first woman who was declared mature.

Charles, like his father Oscar I, was an advocate of Scandinavianism and the political solidarity of the three northern kingdoms, and his friendship with Frederick VII of Denmark, it is said, led him to give half promises of help to Denmark on the eve of the war of 1864, which, in the circumstances, were perhaps misleading and unjustifiable. In view, however, of the unpreparedness of the Swedish army and the difficulties of the situation, Charles was forced to observe a strict neutrality. On behalf of Charles, Dirk de Graeff van Polsbroek, Dutch diplomat in Japan, concluded a "Vänskaps-, handels- och sjöfartstraktat" ("Friendship, Trade and Maritime Treaty") between Sweden-Norway and Japan on 11 November 1868 (see the Treaty of Yokohama). The treaty opened Hakodate, Yokohama, Nagasaki, Kobe and Osaka to trade for Swedish and Norwegian traders (Article 3). The treaty also gave Sweden-Norway the opportunity to send consuls to the newly opened ports, where they were given the right to exercise jurisdiction over Swedes and Norwegians (consular jurisdiction). Charles died in Malmö on 18 September 1872.

Charles XV attained some eminence as a painter and as a poet. He was followed on the thrones of both Norway and Sweden by his brother Oscar II.

In 1872, Charles XV had controversial plans to enter a non-morganatic marriage with the Polish countess Marya Krasińska through the assistance of Ohan Demirgian, plans that aroused opposition both in the royal house and government and which were interrupted only by his death.

Charles's popularity often had him referred to colloquially as "Kron-Kalle" (Crown-Charlie).

Issue
By his wife, Louise of the Netherlands, Charles had two children, a son who died in infancy and a daughter who married the King of Denmark. The early death of his only legitimate son meant that he was succeeded on the throne of Sweden by his younger brother Oscar II.

Charles also sired an illegitimate son, Carl Johan Bolander, (4 February 1854 – 28 July 1903), the father of Bishop Nils Bolander, and daughter, Ellen Svensson Hammar (28 October 1865 – 1931), and it has been widely rumored that he had many more extramarital children.

No subsequent king of Sweden to this day is Charles's descendant. However, his descendants are or have been on the thrones of Denmark, Luxembourg, Greece, Belgium and Norway. A few weeks before Charles's death, his daughter Louise (then the Crown Princess of Denmark) gave birth to her second son. The young Prince of Denmark became christened as grandfather Charles's namesake. In 1905 this grandson, Prince Carl of Denmark, ascended the throne of Norway, becoming thus his maternal grandfather's successor in that country, and assumed the reign name Haakon VII. The present king, Harald V of Norway, is Charles's great-great-grandson, through his father and mother.

Honours 
National decorations
 Knight and Commander of the Seraphim, with Collar, 3 May 1826
 Knight of the Order of Charles XIII, 3 May 1826
 Commander Grand Cross of the Sword, 3 May 1826
 Commander Grand Cross of the Polar Star, 3 May 1826
 Grand Cross of St. Olav, with Collar, 3 May 1826

Foreign decorations

Arms

Ancestry

References

External links

The Royal Norwegian Order of St Olav - Norwegian and Swedish Monarchs Grand Masters of the Order
Family tree of the Royal Norwegian House
Kings of Norway (in Norwegian)
Much material on early kings (in Norwegian)

1826 births
1872 deaths
19th-century Swedish monarchs
19th-century Norwegian monarchs
People from Stockholm
Charles 04
House of Bernadotte
Swedish people of French descent
Regents of Sweden
Regents of Norway
Dukes of Skåne
Swedish Lutherans
Uppsala University alumni
Members of the Royal Swedish Academy of Sciences
Swedish monarchs of German descent
Burials at Riddarholmen Church
Swedish Freemasons

Grand Masters of the Order of Charles XIII
Knights of the Order of Charles XIII
Commanders Grand Cross of the Order of the Sword
Commanders Grand Cross of the Order of the Polar Star
Grand Crosses of the Order of Saint Stephen of Hungary
Grand Commanders of the Order of the Dannebrog
Recipients of the Cross of Honour of the Order of the Dannebrog
Grand Croix of the Légion d'honneur
Recipients of the Order of the Netherlands Lion
3
3
3
Recipients of the Order of the White Eagle (Russia)
Recipients of the Order of St. Anna, 1st class
Knights of the Golden Fleece of Spain
Sons of kings